Franklandia fucifolia, or lanoline bush, is native to the south-west of Western Australia. It is a species in the Franklandia genus of the Proteaceae family.

It was first described by Robert Brown in 1810.

Description 
Franklandia fucifolia is a small shrub, which has a fire-tolerant rootstock, and has no surface covering except for the fruit. The leaves are alternate, and divided into erect, terete lobes with prominent glands. The inflorescence is a terminal, few-flowered raceme. The perianth  is tubular  and has four horizontal lobes. The stamens are inserted at the top of the tube. The ovary is sessile, with one  ovule. The fruit is a narrow nut, topped with a rounded-triangular concave plate  (5-6 mm wide) and hairy on the outside.

Distribution & habitat 
It is widespread in south-western Western Australia, being found from William Bay to Israelite Bay, extending inland to Kojonup. and growing on sand on sand in kwongan,  and open woodland.

References

External links

 Franklandia fusifolia occurrence data from the Australasian Virtual Herbarium

fucifolia
Eudicots of Western Australia
Taxa named by Robert Brown (botanist, born 1773)
Plants described in 1810